The CLEAN algorithm is a computational algorithm to perform a deconvolution on images created in radio astronomy. It was published by Jan Högbom in 1974 and several variations have been proposed since then.

The algorithm assumes that the image consists of a number of point sources. It will iteratively find the highest value in the image and subtract a small gain of this point source convolved with the point spread function ("dirty beam") of the observation, until the highest value is smaller than some threshold. 

Astronomer T. J. Cornwell writes, "The impact of CLEAN on radio astronomy has been immense", both  directly in enabling greater speed and efficiency in observations, and indirectly by encouraging "a wave of innovation in synthesis processing that continues to this day." It has also been applied in other areas of astronomy and many other fields of science.

The CLEAN algorithm and its variations are still extensively used in radio astronomy, for example in the first imaging of the M87 central supermassive black hole by the Event Horizon Telescope.

References

Radio astronomy
Computational astronomy